Morden (otherwise Moreden) is a civil parish in the Purbeck district of south Dorset, England. At the 2011 census the civil parish had 141 households and a population of 323.

As well as the village of Morden, the parish includes the hamlets of East Morden, West Morden and Whitefields.

St Mary's Church, Morden, was rebuilt in 1873 except for the lower part of the 13th-century tower. East Morden has a pub, the Cock & Bottle.

In the north of the parish, Charborough was anciently a separate manor, hamlet and ecclesiastical parish. The Grade I listed 17th-century mansion called Charborough House or Charborough Park stands in an extensive deer park, and near the house is the small parish church, also dedicated to St Mary, rebuilt in 1775 and Grade II* listed.

References

External links

Morden Parish Council
'Morden', in An Inventory of the Historical Monuments in Dorset, Volume 2, South east (London, 1970), pp. 160-173. via British History Online
West Morden – Dorset Life, September 2009

Civil parishes in Dorset
Purbeck District
Villages in Dorset